Pelusita (English title: Fluff) is a Mexican telenovela produced by Valentín Pimstein for Televisa in 1980.

Cast 
Macaria as Pelusita
Rebeca Gómez as Pelusita ('child)
Rafael del Río as Esteban
Saby Kamalich as Beatriz
Juan Antonio Edwards as Ricardo
Jose Roberto Hill as Patricio
Ricardo Blume as Chang Li/Claudio
Maria Clara Zurita as Pastora
Eugenio Cobo as Dr. Zúñiga
Tomas I. Jaime as Father Gabriel
Abraham Stavans as Camarón
Enrique Hidalgo as Julio
Enrique Becker as Elias
Antonio Brillas as Santamaria
Barbara Gil as Rosa
Maleni Morales as Emilia

References

External links 

Mexican telenovelas
1980 telenovelas
Televisa telenovelas
Spanish-language telenovelas
1980 Mexican television series debuts
1981 Mexican television series endings